Mary Joe Fernández and Natasha Zvereva were the defending champions and won in the final 3–6, 7–6, 6–4 against Conchita Martínez and Patricia Tarabini.

Seeds
Champion seeds are indicated in bold text while text in italics indicates the round in which those seeds were eliminated. The top four seeded teams received byes into the second round.

Draw

Finals

Top half

Bottom half

External links
 1995 Italian Open Women's Doubles Draw

Doubles
1995 Italian Open (tennis)